Sargocentron caudimaculatum, the silverspot squirrelfish or whitetail squirrelfish, is a reef-associated member of the family Holocentridae. It is native to the Indian and Pacific Oceans from East Africa to Japan and northern Australia and as far east as the Marshall Islands. It is a nocturnal predator, feeding primarily on crabs and shrimps. It can reach sizes of up to  TL. Although it is caught commercially and can be found in the aquarium trade, there are no known major threats to this species.

References

External links
 
 
 

caudimaculatum
Fish described in 1838
Fish of the Indian Ocean
Fish of the Pacific Ocean
Taxa named by Eduard Rüppell